Harry Barry is an Irish author and medical doctor based in County Louth. He has a particular interest in the area of mental health and has extensive experience in his practice of dealing with issues such as depression, addiction and anxiety. He has written numerous articles for The Irish Independent and two books: Flagging the Problem and Flagging the Therapy, both published by Liberties Press.

References

External links
 Liberties Press The author's page at Liberties Press.

Irish writers
Mental health professionals
Living people
Year of birth missing (living people)